Nikolai Georgiyevich Karpenko (born 26 February 1977 in Novorossiysk) is a former Russian football player.

References

1977 births
People from Novorossiysk
Living people
Russian footballers
FC Chernomorets Novorossiysk players
Russian Premier League players
FC Spartak-UGP Anapa players
FC Slavyansk Slavyansk-na-Kubani players
Association football defenders
Sportspeople from Krasnodar Krai